Leiolepis boehmei, also known commonly as Böhme's butterfly lizard and Böhmes Schmetterlingsagame in German, is a species of lizard in the family Agamidae. The species is endemic to Thailand.

Etymology
The specific name, boehmei, is in honor of German herpetologist Wolfgang Böhme.

Geographic range
L. boehmei is found in southern Thailand.

Habitat
The preferred natural habitat of L. boehmei is coastal areas with beach forest or sand dunes.

Description
The tail is long, slightly more than twice SVL. Dorsally, it is dark olive. Ventrally, it is grayish.

Behavior
L. boehmei is terrestrial and fossorial.

Reproduction
L. boehmi is a unisexual, all female, diploid species, which reproduces by parthenogenesis.

References

Further reading
Chanard T, Parr JWK, Nabhitabhata J (2015). A Field Guide to the Reptiles of Thailand. New York: Oxford University Press. 352 pp.  (hardcover),  (paperback). (Leiolepis boehmei, p. 101).
Darevsky IS, Kupriyanova LA (1993). "Two new all-female lizard species of the genus Leiolepis Cuvier, 1829 from Thailand and Vietnam (Squamata: Sauria: Uromastycinae)". Herpetozoa 6 (1–2): 3–20. (Leiolepis boehmei, new species, pp. 4–8, Figure 1). (in English, with an abstract in German).
Grismer JL, Bauer AM, Grismer LL, Thirakhupt K, Aowphol A, Oaks JR, Wood PL, Onn CK, Thy N, Cota M, Jackman T (2014). "Multiple origins of parthenogenesis, and a revised species phylogeny for the Southeast Asian butterfly lizards, Leiolepis ". Biological Journal of the Linnean Society 113 (4): 1080–1093. 

Leiolepis
Reptiles of Thailand
Reptiles described in 1993
Taxa named by Ilya Darevsky